The 2001 Asian Super Cup was the 7th Asian Super Cup, a football match played between the winners of the previous season's Asian Club Championship and Asian Cup Winners Cup competitions. The 2001 competition was contested by Suwon Samsung Bluewings of South Korea, who won the 2000–01 Asian Club Championship, and Al Shabab of Saudi Arabia, the winners of the 2000–01 Asian Cup Winners' Cup.

Route to the Super Cup

Suwon Samsung Bluewings 

1Suwon Samsung Bluewings goals always recorded first.

Al Shabab 

1Al Shabab goals always recorded first.

Game summary 

|}

First leg

Second leg

References 
 Asian Super Cup 2001

Asian Super Cup
Super Cup
2001
2001
Suwon Samsung Bluewings matches
Al Shabab FC (Riyadh) matches